The third season of the television comedy Portlandia aired on IFC in the United States on December 14, 2012 and concluded on March 1, 2012, consisting a total of 11 episodes with the season kicking off with a special Christmas episode.

Cast

Main cast
 Fred Armisen
 Carrie Brownstein

Special guest cast
 Kyle MacLachlan as Mr. Mayor

Recurring cast
 Chloë Sevigny as Alexandra

Guest stars

Episodes

References

External links 

 

Portlandia (TV series)
2012 American television seasons
2013 American television seasons